The Mountain States League was a Class D minor league baseball league which operated in the United States from 1911 to 1912. The league previously operated as the Virginia Valley League in 1910. Its teams hailed from Kentucky, Ohio, and West Virginia.

History
During the 1911 season, season ended on September 12, 1911 after an investigation ordered by the National Association disclosed two cases of improper conduct in late season games to prevent Middleport-Pomeroy from winning the second half title. These games were later deducted at the fall meeting.

In 1912, the league folded during the season. After numerous teams had folded, the league stopped play on July 8, 1912, with the Ironton Forgers in 1st place.

After a three decade hiatus, the league revived in 1948, becoming the Mountain States League (1948–1954).

Cities represented
Ashland, KY & Catlettsburg, KY: Ashland-Catlettsburg Twins (1911–1912)
Charleston, WV:Charleston Senators (1911–1912)
Huntington, WV: Huntington Blue Sox (1911–1912)
Ironton, OH: Ironton Nailers (1911); Ironton Forgers (1912)
Middleport, OH & Pomeroy, OH: Middleport-Pomeroy  (1912)
Montgomery, WV: Montgomery Miners (1911–1912)
Point Pleasant, WV & Gallipolis, OH: Point Pleasant-Gallipolis/Middleport-Pomeroy (1911)
Williamson, WV: Williamson (1912)

Standings & statistics
1911 Mountain States Leagueschedule
  Point Pleasant-Gallipolis (16-32) moved to Middleport-Pomeroy July 1 The season ended September 12
 
1912 Mountain States League
Middleport-Pomeroy (7–21) moved to Montgomery June 16; Montgomery disbanded June 29; Charleston disbanded July 1; Ashland-Catlettsburg and Huntington disbanded July 8, ending the season.

References

Johnson, Lloyd, and Wolff, Miles, eds., The Encyclopedia of Minor League Baseball, 3rd edition. Durham, North Carolina: Baseball America, 2007.

Defunct minor baseball leagues in the United States
Baseball leagues in West Virginia
Baseball leagues in Ohio
Baseball leagues in Kentucky
Defunct professional sports leagues in the United States
1911 establishments in the United States
1912 disestablishments in the United States
Sports leagues established in 1911
Sports leagues disestablished in 1912